Robert Benson Scott (born April 2, 1949) is a former American football quarterback who played ten seasons in the National Football League (NFL) for the New Orleans Saints. He then played for the New Jersey Generals and Chicago Blitz of the United States Football League (USFL) in 1983. He graduated from Rossville High School in Rossville, Georgia.  He was second on the Saints depth chart behind Archie Manning.  In 1976, Manning had surgery on his throwing shoulder and Scott had the opportunity to start. During a televised game, he tripped over a television cable and blew out a knee which ended his season.

As quarterback for the University of Tennessee Volunteers, Scott was named Most Valuable Player in the 1971 Sugar Bowl.  Tennessee defeated the Air Force Academy Falcons 34-13 in the game.

References

1949 births
Living people
American football quarterbacks
Chicago Blitz players
New Jersey Generals players
New Orleans Saints players
Tennessee Volunteers football players
Sportspeople from Chattanooga, Tennessee
Players of American football from Tennessee
People from Rossville, Georgia